A compound of five tetrahemihexahedra is a uniform polyhedron compound and a symmetric arrangement of five tetrahemihexahedra. It is chiral with icosahedral symmetry (I).

Related polyhedra 

Its convex hull is an icosidodecahedron. Hence it is a faceting of an icosidodecahedron, shown at left. It shares its edges and triangular faces with the compound of five octahedra.

See also 
 Compound of twenty tetrahemihexahedra

References 
.

Polyhedral compounds